Dandenong Market is a major-regional market located in the heart of Dandenong, Victoria in the South East of Melbourne, at the corner of Clow and Cleeland Streets. Dandenong Market is one of Melbourne's oldest markets, established in 1866, and is one of Australia's largest, with over 200 market traders  spread over 8000 square metres  and attracting over 5 million visitors a year. It is approximately 30 kilometres south-east of Melbourne.

Dandenong's market has long served as an important focus for the area.  The market, originally located at Lonsdale and McCrae Streets, was relocated to its current location in 1926.  As a part of state redevelopment efforts in the City of Greater Dandenong, the market received a $26 million towards refurbishment that was completed in 2011.

Dandenong Market is primarily known as a home to 150 nationalities, and its traditional market atmosphere. The market is home to both stalls and shops selling fresh fruit and veg, seafood and meat, deli items, bakeries, and florists. The market also has a large general merchandise area, "The Bazaar" featuring 120 traders selling clothing, jewelry, toys, home ware and computer equipment.

Dandenong Market is also known for popular events and festivals, including Dandenong World Fare which attracts over 35,000 visitors, the Full Moon festival and Diwali.

History

It was in the late 1840s that the first permanent dwelling was established in future township of Dandenong. The town on the Dandenong Creek grew rapidly and in 1863 citizens from the recently established Dandenong Improvement petitioned the government for approval to establish a public market in their growing town.

The first market day was Tuesday, 10 October 1866. One of the early advertisement stated that for sale there would be: "A choice lot of dairy cows, with calves; heifers springing, 50 head store cattle, a quantity of useful horses, fat and store pigs, well-bread rams,  poultry, potatoes, and other produce; drays, spring-cart and farming implements, &c." It also noted "Lunch will be provided."

At first held fortnightly, the market was soon a weekly event.  By 1870, the market had up to 300 vendors and buyers in attendance. Auctioneers sold livestock, fruit, dairy products, skins, lard, honey, hay and other farm produce.  Farmers from throughout the La Trobe Valley and Gippsland travelled to Dandenong to buy and sell. One Gippsland farmer later recalled the difficulties of travelling by road. He stated, "After some years, we commenced carting our butter, eggs and bacon to the Dandenong market. The roads were still very bad; the journey always took three strenuous days."

References

External links
 Official website

Retail markets in Melbourne
1866 establishments in Australia
Dandenong, Victoria
Market halls
Food retailers